Malinovo is a rural locality (a settlement) in Volokonovsky District, Belgorod Oblast, Russia. The population was 268 as of 2010. There are 4 streets.

Geography 
Malinovo is located 21 km west of Volokonovka (the district's administrative centre) by road. Novodevichy and Krasny Pakhar are the nearest rural localities.

References 

Rural localities in Volokonovsky District